John Brown Payne (1 July 1828 – 23 September 1887) was an English first-class cricketer.

Payne was born in July 1828 at Knutsford, Cheshire. He made his debut in first-class cricket for Manchester against Sussex at Eccles in 1858, taking figures of 5 for 59 in Sussex's first-innings. Two years later, he made a second first-class appearance for the Gentlemen of the North against the Gentlemen of the South at Salford, with Payne taking his best first-class figures of 5 for 36 in the Gentlemen of the South's first-innings. His final two first-class appearances came for the North against Surrey in 1862 and 1863. Payne was by profession a lawyer. He died in September 1887 at Broughton, Lancashire. His son was the rugby union international and cricketer John Payne.

References

External links

1828 births
1887 deaths
People from Knutsford
English cricketers
Manchester Cricket Club cricketers
Gentlemen of the North cricketers
North v South cricketers
19th-century English lawyers